Hemidactylus minutus is a species of gecko. It is found from northeastern Oman to extreme eastern Yemen.

References

Hemidactylus
Reptiles described in 2014
Reptiles of the Middle East
Reptiles of the Arabian Peninsula